The A4109 road, known as the Inter-Valley Road, links Aberdulais with Glynneath in Neath Port Talbot county borough, Wales.

The route begins in Aberdulais at the junction with the A4230 and A465 roads; it diverges northwards away from the A465 up the Dulais Valley and crosses through the settlements of Crynant, Ynysfforch, Seven Sisters, Onllwyn, Dyffryn Cellwen and Banwen where it has a junction with the A4221.  The road then continues in a southeasterly direction along the Inter Valley Road to Glynneath where it again connects with the A465.

The road is noteworthy for the amount of roadkill to be found on the road.

Roads in Wales
Transport in Neath Port Talbot
Dulais Valley